|}

The Brownstown Stakes is a Group 3 flat horse race in Ireland open to thoroughbred fillies and mares aged three years or older. It is run at Fairyhouse over a distance of 7 furlongs (1,408 metres), and it is scheduled to take place each year in late June or early July.

History
The event was formerly held at Leopardstown, and for a period it was classed at Listed level. It used to be run over a distance of 1 mile.

The race was promoted to Group 3 status and cut to 7 furlongs in 2003. It was transferred to Fairyhouse in 2009.

The Brownstown Stakes was run at Naas in 2012, after being abandoned twice at Fairyhouse due to a waterlogged course.

Records
Most successful horse:
 no horse has won this race more than once since 1987

Leading jockey since 1987 (4 wins):
 Pat Smullen – Mora (1998), Dress to Thrill (2002), Perfect Touch (2003), Emulous (2011)
 Kevin Manning - Castle Quest (1999), Siringas (2001), Tropical Lady (2004), Tobann (2014)

Leading trainer since 1987 (4 wins):
 Dermot Weld – Kayfa (1994), Dress to Thrill (2002), Perfect Touch (2003), Emulous (2011)
 Jim Bolger - Castle Quest (1999), Siringas (2001), Tropical Lady (2004), Tobann (2014)
 Ger Lyons -  Berg Bahn (2010), Ainippe (2015), Queen Catrine (2016), Marbling (2022)

Winners since 1987

See also
 List of Irish flat horse races

References
 Racing Post:

 galopp-sieger.de – Brownstown Stakes.
 horseracingintfed.com – International Federation of Horseracing Authorities – Brownstown Stakes (2017).
 pedigreequery.com – Brownstown Stakes.

Flat races in Ireland
Mile category horse races for fillies and mares
Leopardstown Racecourse